Rositsa Dimitrova (born 21 February 1955) is a Bulgarian former volleyball player who competed in the 1980 Summer Olympics.

In 1980 she was part of the Bulgarian team which won the bronze medal in the Olympic tournament. She played four matches.

References 
 

1955 births
Living people
Bulgarian women's volleyball players
Olympic volleyball players of Bulgaria
Volleyball players at the 1980 Summer Olympics
Olympic bronze medalists for Bulgaria
Olympic medalists in volleyball
Medalists at the 1980 Summer Olympics